Charles Grangier de la Ferrière (21 September 1738, Pontchâteau8 March 1794, Paris) was a French general of the War of the First Coalition.

Life
He entered the French army on 12 April 1756, joining a gendarme regiment before moving to the line infantry in 1758. On 5 February 1792 he was made colonel of the 23rd Infantry Regiment. On 28 April 1792 he was général Custine's second-in-command in the capture of Porrentruy.

He was promoted to brigade-general in the Army of the Alps on 15 May 1793, but was sacked on 7 October 1793 and arrested on 29 October the same year at Mende. 

He was transported to Paris and condemned to execution by the revolutionary tribunal. He was guillotined on 8 March 1794.

References 

1738 births
1794 deaths
French Republican military leaders of the French Revolutionary Wars
French people executed by guillotine during the French Revolution